Andreas Haavoll (25 September 1869 – 6 March 1958) was a Norwegian schoolteacher, banker, publisher, newspaper editor and magazine editor.

Haavoll was born in Ørsta. He was a teacher by education, and worked as schoolteacher and banker for about twenty years. He was assigned with various newspapers, and founded the newspaper Nordmør in 1903. He was a co-founder of Det Norske Teatret in 1912, and edited the newspaper Den 17de Mai from 1913 to 1917. He published the children's magazine Norsk Barneblad from 1912, and edited the magazine from 1916 to 1954. Haavoll was honorary member of the organizations Norsk Bladmannalag, Det Norske Samlaget and Noregs Mållag. He was awarded the Melsom Prize in 1939.

References

1869 births
1958 deaths
People from Ørsta
Norwegian publishers (people)
Norwegian newspaper editors
Norwegian magazine editors
Nynorsk-language writers
Norwegian schoolteachers